Karin Ulrika Olofsdotter (born June 16, 1966) is a Swedish diplomat and Swedish Ambassador to the United States. She started her role as Ambassador of Sweden to the United States on September 1, 2017.

Career
Karin Olofsdotter entered the Foreign Service in 1994, and served as Chief of Staff to several Swedish Foreign Ministers and as Director of the Ministers Office in Stockholm before joining the Embassy in Washington.

Before her assignment to Washington, D.C., Olofsdotter served as Director-General for Trade at the Ministry for Foreign Affairs in Sweden from September 1, 2016. Olofsdotter has also held the position of Deputy Director-General and Head of the Department for Promotion of Sweden, Trade and CSR in Stockholm in the two years prior.

From 2011 to August 2014, Olofsdotter was Swedish Ambassador to Hungary. While in Hungary, on  9 September 2012, Olofsdotter attend the "dedication ceremony yesterday of the Raoul Wallenberg Memorial Park, which was held in the courtyard of the Dohany Street Synagogue in Budapest". From 2008 and 2011, Olofsdotter was Deputy Chief of Mission in Washington, D.C.

She has also served at the Swedish EU Representation in Brussels, Belgium, working with European security policy and defense issues. She chaired the EU's Political-Military Group during the Swedish Presidency of the EU in 2001. Prior to this she worked at the Swedish delegation to NATO. Her first posting was in Moscow, Russia, where she was mainly responsible for covering Belarus.

As a part of diplomatic outreach, Olofsdotter, with Karl-Theodor zu Guttenberg was part of a town hall style meeting in Peters Township, south of Pittsburgh, Pennsylvania.

Ambassador Olofsdotter has a B.A. in psychology, economics and Russian. She studied at the UCLA Anderson School of Management and speaks Swedish, Russian, French and English.

Publications 
 Sweden refused to impose a coronavirus lockdown. The country's ambassador explains why, Los Angeles Times, 2020

References

External links
 
 

1966 births
Living people
Ambassadors of Sweden to Hungary
Ambassadors of Sweden to the United States
Lund University alumni
Swedish women ambassadors
University of California, Los Angeles alumni
20th-century Swedish women